Pandanus utilis, the common screwpine is, despite its name, a monocot and not a pine.
It is native to Madagascar and naturalised in Mauritius and the Seychelles.

Description
The trunk features aerial prop roots. The leaves are linear and spiny, with a spiral arrangement on the tree. The leaves are also dried out and rolled, and used to make mats in Kerala, India; and Hawaii.
Care must be taken when handling the leaves because of their sharp spines.

The fruit of Pandanus utilis is edible, although not flavorful to humans and must be cooked prior to consumption.
It attracts mammals such as, in North America, squirrels.

Introduction 
Within the family Pandanaceae, the genus Pandanus is thought to compose the largest group of plants. It is estimated that there are somewhere between 500 and 1,000 species within this genus. Pandanus utilis (pan-DAY-nus YOO-tih-liss), otherwise known as the common screwpine, is one such plant within this family. The origin of P. utilis has traditionally been thought to be Madagascar, but more recently the Mascarene Islands have been suggested as a possible place of origin. A long history of cultivation and transport to many parts of the world makes the origin difficult to trace. However, it is known to be grown in Senegal, Benin, Tanzania, Madagascar, Réunion, Maldives and Mauritius. P. utilis has been introduced to many tropical and subtropical regions, including Central America, the Caribbean, the United States (southern Florida, Puerto Rico), Brazil, India, and Indonesia.

Pandanus utilis was discovered by French naturalist Jean Baptiste Bory de Saint-Vincent.  Although they were given a common name of pine, they are monocots, more closely related to grasses, orchids and palms than to conifer trees such as pines. Their name is derived from the spiral arrangement of their leaves around the branches.

Morphology 

They are found in tropical areas and have an upright trunk that is smooth with many horizontal spreading branches with annular leaf scars. Old leaf scars spiral around the branches and trunk, like a screw. The anatomy of Pandanaceae stems can be distinguished from other monocotyledons by the presence of a compound vascular bundle. This bi- or tripolar vascular bundle has two or three distinct conduction strands encased by a common bundle sheath. At the end of each branch is a spiral cluster of long, linear leaves with a pectinate (comb-like) edge tapering to a long point at the apex. This margin is filled with small reddish colored teeth. They are without petioles and are broadly clasped at the base. The leaf venation is parallel running longitudinal. The blue/green to dark green leaves is rather stiff with a waxy texture. The leaves of P. utilis have a spongy tissue with numerous fibers arranged in bundles. These bundles can contain over 150 fibers.

As with other member of the genus Pandanus, P. utilis lacks secondary growth. The secondary growth of most trees is the production of wood to aid in support of the trunk.  Without this supportive structure, the P. utilis grows many pale brown prop roots at the base of the trunk. These adventitious roots arise from the stem above the soil level and help support the plant. These roots not only anchor the tree but also keep it upright during times of heavy winds and rain in tropical regions. Prop roots can be  in diameter.

P. utilis is dioecious, with the female and male reproducing structures occurring on different plants. Individual plants are either male producing microspores or female producing megaspores. This plant being unisexual allows it to cross-fertilize with other screwpines. The male plants produce fragrant colorful flowers in long spikes. The female plants produce fruits resembling pineapples or oversized pine cones changing from green to yellow/orange when ripe. The female structure has a 3–8 celled ovary crowned by a sessile stigma.

This species is naturalised in several of the Mascarene islands, where it coexists with a great number of other indigenous and endemic Pandanus species. It can usually be distinguished from these however, by the tip of the free portion of each drupe of its fruit-head, which usually does not have an areole. The tip is usually also cleft between the stigmas. The fruit-heads are very variable, but usually stand out by being up to 20 cm wide and containing 100-200 drupes.

Ecology 

P. utilis grows well near the sea, being salt-tolerant.  It is a strictly tropical tree that will not survive frost.  It grows in full sun to partial shade but prefers at least 6 hours of direct sunlight.  Seeds take two to three months to germinate.

Use and Management

The screw pine has been shown to have many uses.  In coastal areas, it has been used for erosion control due to its numerous aerial roots. These roots help bind the sand dunes along the coast from eroding water and wind. The leaves of P. utilis are used in different cultures for thatching and the production of numerous materials. In areas like Madagascar, Réunion and Mauritius, the leaves are used to make ropes, baskets, mats, hats, place mats, nets, thatched roofs for homes and even paper. The waxy covering over the leaves makes them especially attractive for baskets and roofs with their natural water-resistant surface. The fruits form a starchy food and can be eaten after being cooked.

Chemical Composition 
Pandalisines A and B are two novel indolizidine alkaloids from this plant.

Pests and Diseases 

Few diseases have been recorded on members of the Pandanaceae within Papua New Guinea or worldwide. With the exception of a single suspected virus disease causing yellow mottling on the leaves and an MLO disease causing decline in P. utilis in Florida all diseases recorded on Pandanus have been caused by fungal pathogens.  No major pests are of much concern to this plant.

Gallery

Garden plant in Florida

See also
Indolizine
Swainsonine
Heyneanine
Domesticated plants and animals of Austronesia

References

External links

 

utilis
Flora of Madagascar
Flora of Mauritius
Flora of Réunion
Trees of Seychelles
Garden plants of Africa
Ornamental trees